Nargeslu-ye Sofla (also Romanized as Nargeslū-ye Soflá; also known as Kūrānlū, Nargeslupā’īn, and Nargeslū-ye Pā’īn) is a village in Badranlu Rural District, in the Central District of Bojnord County, North Khorasan Province, Iran. At the 2006 census, its population was 229, in 63 families.

References 

Populated places in Bojnord County